Disney Springs (previously known as Lake Buena Vista Shopping Village in 1975, Walt Disney World Village in 1977, Disney Village Marketplace in 1989, and Downtown Disney in 1997) is an outdoor shopping, dining, and entertainment complex at the Walt Disney World Resort in Lake Buena Vista, Florida, near Orlando. It opened on March 22, 1975, and has been expanded and renamed over the years. In 2013, plans were announced for a three-year renovation and expansion, and on September 29, 2015, the name was officially changed to Disney Springs.

The  complex includes four distinct areas: Marketplace, The Landing, Town Center, and West Side. Buses and water taxis operated by Disney Transport provide transportation between Disney Springs and other areas of Walt Disney World.

History

Early expansion; multiple rebrandings

The Lake Buena Vista Shopping Village, which opened on March 22, 1975, was originally envisioned as an area shopping mall. Two years after its opening, the complex was renamed Walt Disney World Village. With the advent of new management under Michael Eisner in 1984, Disney began looking for ways to keep vacationers on Walt Disney World property longer, and prevent them from leaving for entertainment beyond Disney's borders.

To compete with the popular Church Street Station clubs in downtown Orlando, Disney announced the addition of Pleasure Island, featuring nightclubs showcasing Disney's quality and creativity, to Walt Disney World Village on July 21, 1986. Construction began the following August and Pleasure Island was opened on May 1, 1989, the same day as the Disney's Hollywood Studios theme park. Later that year, the complex was renamed Disney Village Marketplace.

In the mid-1990s, the growth of Walt Disney World created the potential for further expansion, leading to a $1 billion investment in projects across the resort. The first World of Disney store opened October 2, 1996, in Marketplace.

On June 20, 1995, major enhancements and expansions were announced for the area, with the Disney Village Marketplace and Pleasure Island being combined into a newly branded district named Downtown Disney. The re-branding was introduced on September 7, 1997. On September 15, Downtown Disney West Side, a  expansion, opened as a third shopping, dining, and entertainment area featuring venues such as La Nouba (the former Cirque Du Soleil show in residence which closed at the end of 2017), DisneyQuest, and Virgin Megastore. Major changes to the complex also included the conversion of Mickey's Character Shop into the World of Disney, becoming the world's largest Disney store, in addition to the expansion and upgrade of the AMC Pleasure Island Theatres, as well as the opening of Rainforest Cafe and Planet Hollywood. On September 27, 2008, the Pleasure Island nightclubs closed.

The Downtown Disney Mall Complex gained a sister district in California on January 12, 2001, with the addition of Downtown Disney at the Disneyland Resort. Similar complexes also exist at other Disney resorts: Disney Village, which opened on April 12, 1992, at Disneyland Resort Paris; Ikspiari, which opened on July 7, 2000, at the Tokyo Disney Resort; and Disneytown at Shanghai Disney Resort.

Renovation, expansion, and renaming

On March 14, 2013, Walt Disney Parks and Resorts chairman Tom Staggs announced that Downtown Disney would be redesigned and renamed as Disney Springs. The 3-year renovation and expansion project would include 150 new tenants, two parking structures, and a near-doubling of mall area. Prior to this announcement, the last renovation of Downtown Disney had been in 1997.

In order to facilitate the construction of the area and the increase in capacity, two large parking structures were constructed in previous surface parking lot areas. New construction features include new bridges connecting the complex to Disney's Saratoga Springs resort, with further bridges connecting The Landing to the Marketplace, The Springs, Town Center and West Side. High Line structures were built across the West Side in order to provide both theme and shade. In addition, a new bus terminal, with dedicated bus lanes on Buena Vista Drive, was built; Buena Vista Drive was widened, and a new exit ramp built from Interstate 4 directly to Disney Springs, as part of the traffic upgrade. The complex was renamed Disney Springs on September 29, 2015. Town Center, built just south of The Landing in the surface parking lots, was opened on May 15, 2016, completing the major construction on the project. A third parking garage began construction in 2017 across Buena Vista Drive and opened as Grapefruit Garage on April 16, 2019. 

On March 17, 2020, Disney Springs closed due to the COVID-19 pandemic in Florida. On May 7, 2020, it was announced that Disney Springs would begin a phased reopening on May 20.

Areas
Disney Springs is divided into four areas: Marketplace, The Landing, Town Center, and West Side. The complex is bordered by Lake Buena Vista to the north and the parking garages and surface lots to the south. Walt Disney Imagineering took inspiration for Disney Springs from real coastal towns found throughout Florida, such as St. Augustine and Coral Gables.

Creative director Dave Hoffman said about the area, "Each neighborhood reflects its function and [the fictional] time period when it was developed." According to the town's fictional history, Disney Springs was settled in the mid-1800s by a cattle rancher who discovered the town's namesake springs and the town subsequently expanded from the springs outwards.

Marketplace
The Marketplace houses many shops and restaurants reminiscent of the American Craftsman-style of the 1930s. The first restaurant in the Earl of Sandwich chain is located here. T-Rex Cafe is a dinosaur-themed restaurant operated by Landry's Restaurants, which features animatronic dinosaurs. It opened on October 14, 2008. Landry's Restaurants also operates Rainforest Cafe at this location. A walkway spanning the Village Lake and connecting Rainforest Cafe with the Lego Store—The Marketplace Causeway—was constructed and opened in 2015.

The Landing
The Landing depicts the fictional town's transportation hub and marina. The Landing features nautical-themed restaurants and shops, including Jock Lindsey's Hangar Bar—an aviation-themed dive bar based on the character from the Indiana Jones films—and The Boathouse, which serves as the port for the amphibious automobiles that offer cruises of Lake Buena Vista.The Amphicar is the amphibious vehicle use for the cruises. 

The Landing was in the site of Pleasure Island, a nighttime entertainment district with two comedy clubs and four dance clubs. These areas closed permanently on September 27, 2008. On November 18, 2010, Disney announced a project named Hyperion Wharf, which was planned to replace the Pleasure Island complex. Pleasure Island would have undergone extensive renovations and re-theming to transform into the early twentieth century wharf-themed entertainment area. New shopping and dining locations would have also been added. In July 2011, it was announced that these plans were delayed. The plans were later canceled because it was deemed better to totally overhaul the Downtown Disney area.  With the advent of Disney Springs, the former Pleasure Island was redesigned as The Landing in 2015.

The Empress Lilly

The structure originally known as the Empress Lilly is a static full-size replica of a paddle steamer riverboat on Village Lake. It is 220 feet long and 62 feet wide. Though it resembles a paddle steamer boat, it is actually a boat-shaped building on a submerged concrete foundation.

It opened on May 1, 1977, when it was christened by Walt Disney's widow, Lillian Disney, for whom it was named. It originally housed four separate entertainment and dining areas.  In the mid-1990s, Levy Restaurants signed a contract to operate the "ship" for 20 years. On April 22, 1995, the Empress Lilly closed. The interior was remodeled and the old smokestacks and paddlewheel were removed due to rust and rot. The restaurant opened as Fulton's Crab House on March 10, 1996. Fulton's Crab House closed for major renovations in 2016 to be remodeled into a new restaurant, Paddlefish.

Town Center
Town Center depicts the fictional town's central business district, featuring Spanish Revival architecture from the 1920s. The Town Center area also features the namesake "springs", which are artificial.

The area debuted in 2016, having been built on former surface parking lots, and features many well known retailers. The area will open in multiple phases, with the first phase having opened on May 15, 2017. Retailers to have opened in the first phase of Town Center include Anthropologie, Uniqlo (the first of its kind in the Southeastern United States), Sephora, L'Occitane en Provence, Pandora, UGG, Johnston & Murphy, ZARA and Kate Spade and Trophy Room among many others.

West Side

West Side depicts the town's exposition center, having been developed in the 1950s, according to the town's fictional history.

The expansion of the existing AMC Theatres Pleasure Island 24 venue opened with Downtown Disney West Side in 1997. Renovations began in late 2010, which created theaters offering enhanced food service. The complex was renamed AMC Downtown Disney 24. In 1997, there were plans to open a Planet Movies by AMC entertainment complex at this location by combining the Planet Hollywood restaurant with a re-branded AMC megaplex. These plans were abandoned due to Planet Hollywood's continued financial problems. The complex has now been renamed AMC Disney Springs 24. DisneyQuest was located in this area until it closed on July 2, 2017, and was subsequently demolished. The NBA Experience, which was built on the DisneyQuest site, briefly operated for 7 months from August 12, 2019 through March 2020 due to closures related to the COVID-19 pandemic. On August 16, 2021, it was confirmed that the location would never reopen.

Transportation 

There are 3 parking garages at Disney Springs: the Orange Garage, the Lime Garage, and the Grapefruit Garage. There are also 4 surface parking lots: the Lemon Parking Lot, the Mango Parking Lot, the Strawberry Parking Lot, and the Watermelon Parking Lot. A direct exit exists from westbound Interstate 4 to Disney Springs which is directly connected to the Orange Garage. Parking is free although valet parking is available for a fee of $20. Disney Springs is served by Disney Transport buses which serve all Disney resort hotels. There is no direct bus service from Disney Springs to Disney parks although one-way bus services are provided from Disney parks to Disney Springs after 4 pm. However, direct bus service to Disney Parks is available from the Congress Park bus stop at Saratoga Springs (located near Rainforest Cafe in Disney Springs) and bus service is available from Disney Springs to the Contemporary Resort (near Magic Kingdom) and the Boardwalk, Beach Club and Yacht Club resorts (near Epcot and Disney's Hollywood Studios). Ferry service is provided within Disney Springs and from Disney Springs to the Saratoga Springs, Old Key West, and Port Orleans resorts. Disney Springs is also served by Lynx bus routes 300, 301, 302, 303, 304, 306 and 312 which depart from the bus terminal on the west side of Disney Springs adjacent to the Watermelon Parking Lot. A Brightline train station was planned to be built near Disney Springs which would have provided service to Tampa, Orlando Airport, and Miami, however, on June 28, 2022, Disney announced that the station would not be built nor would the train run on the Walt Disney World park property.

References

External links

 
1975 establishments in Florida
Buildings and structures in Lake Buena Vista, Florida
Tourist attractions in Greater Orlando
Walt Disney World
Walt Disney Parks and Resorts attractions
Shopping malls in Florida
Shopping malls established in 1975